Alfred August Christensen (August 16, 1905 – 1974) was a Danish chess player.

Biography
He participated in Danish Chess Championship in 1935, 1936, 1939, and 1942.

Alfred Christensen played for Denmark in Chess Olympiads:
 In 1936, at seventh board in 3rd unofficial Chess Olympiad in Munich (+11 –4 =4) and won individual silver medal;
 In 1939, at third board in 8th Chess Olympiad in Buenos Aires (+5 –9 =5).

Christensen was a chess writer. In 1943 he published the book "I Caissas Tjeneste" where he annotated his games played between 1934 and 1942. He also co-authored with Bjørn Nielsen the chess textbook "Alt om Skak" (Odense, 1943).

References

External links
 
 

1905 births
1974 deaths
Danish chess players
Chess writers
Chess Olympiad competitors
20th-century chess players
20th-century Danish people